The 2009 Ligue 1 season was the 44th of the competition of the first-tier football in Senegal and the second professional season.  The tournament was organized by the Senegalese Football Federation.  The season began a little earlier on 2 May and finished on 31 October.  It was the first season labelled as a "League" ("Ligue" in French).  ASC Linguère won their first and only title, the next club to win three consecutive titles, and a year later would compete in the 2010 CAF Champions League.  ASC Diaraf who won the 2008 Senegalese Cup participated in the 2009 CAF Confederation Cup.  Since that season, only one club each would qualify into the continental championship or cup, the winner of each.  The West African Cup was again revived and brought two clubs, a second place club from Ligue 1 and a second placed Senegalese Cup club.

The season would have feature 20 clubs, 18 clubs competed instead as ASC Thiès and CNEPS Excellence forfeited the season. A total of 128 matches and the playoff system, again, in several seasons, two matches that decided the winner in the most goals, or if a match is scoreless, penalty shootouts.  The season scored a total of 227 goals, 101 in Group A and 126 in Group B, no goals scored in the finals which finished in penalty shootouts in the second leg.

AS Douanes again was the defending team of the title.

Participating clubs

 Renaissance sportive de Yoff
 ASC Linguère
 ASC Port Autonome
 AS Douanes
 ASC Jeanne d'Arc
 ASC Saloum
 US Gorée
 Casa Sport
 ASC Yakaar
 ASC Xam Xam
 Compagnie sucrière sénégalaise (Senegalese Sugar Company)

 ASC HLM
 ASC Diaraf
 ASC Thiès - forfeited
 CNEPS Excellence - forfeited
 Dakar Université Club
 ASC SUNEOR
 ASEC Ndiambour
 Stade de Mbour
 US Ouakam
 Guédiawaye FC

Overview
The league was contested by 18 teams and two groups, each group contained ten clubs and a final match.

League standings

Group A

Group B

Final phase

Top scorers

References

Senegal
2008–09 in Senegalese football
Senegal Premier League seasons